Hope River may refer to:

 Hope River (Jamaica)
 Hope River (Tasman) in the South Island of New Zealand
 Hope River (Canterbury) in the South Island of New Zealand
 Hope River (West Coast) in the South Island of New Zealand
 Hope River (Western Australia)
 Hope River (Canada) Chilliwack, British Columbia

See also 
 Hope (disambiguation)
 Good Hope River
 Little Hope River